Ailinzebina elegantissima is a species of minute sea snail, a marine gastropod mollusk or micromollusk in the family Rissoinidae. The species name is Latin for the "most elegant".

Description 
The maximum recorded shell length is 3.75 mm.

Distribution
This species occurs in the Caribbean Sea, the Gulf of Mexico and the Lesser Antilles.

Habitat 
Minimum recorded depth is 0 m. Maximum recorded depth is 128 m.

References

 Rosenberg, G., F. Moretzsohn, and E. F. García. 2009. Gastropoda (Mollusca) of the Gulf of Mexico, Pp. 579–699 in Felder, D.L. and D.K. Camp (eds.), Gulf of Mexico–Origins, Waters, and Biota. Biodiversity. Texas A&M Press, College Station, Texas.
 Sleurs W.J.M. (1993). A revision of the Recent species of Rissoina (Moerchiella), R. (Apataxia), R. (Ailinzebina) and R. (Pachyrissoina) (Gastropoda: Rissoidae). Bulletin de l'Institut Royal des Sciences Naturelles de Belgique, 63: 71-13

External links
 

Rissoinidae
Gastropods described in 1842